The Shiyazi Dam is a concrete gravity dam on the Hongjiadu River, a tributary of the Wu River, in Wuchuan County, Guizhou Province, China. The primary purpose of the dam is hydroelectric power generation. Construction on the dam began in 2007 and concrete pouring in April 2008. The reservoir began to impound in September 2010. The dam was "capped off" with concrete on 24 December 2011 and the generators were commissioned a week later on 31 December. The dam, being located in a steep portion of Meilin Canyon, was difficult to construct.

See also

List of dams and reservoirs in China
List of major power stations in Guizhou

References

Dams in China
Hydroelectric power stations in Guizhou
Gravity dams
Dams completed in 2010
Roller-compacted concrete dams